Matt Lord (born 7 January 1978) is a rugby union player for Northampton Saints in the Guinness Premiership. He plays as a lock. He was born in Taumarunui, New Zealand.

References

External links
Guinness Premiership profile

Living people
1978 births
New Zealand rugby union players
Northampton Saints players
People from Taumarunui